William Keith Emerson (May 1, 1925 – October 19, 2016), usually known as Bill Emerson, was an American malacologist, a biologist who studied mollusks. He was a Curator Emeritus at the American Museum of Natural History in New York City where he had been a curator since 1955. He was also Chairman of the Department of Living Invertebrates and head of the Malacology section for several decades.

Books
Emerson has written numerous scientific publications and several popular shell books including:

The American Museum of Natural History Guide to Shells: Land, Freshwater, and Marine from Nova Scotia to Florida by William K. Emerson and Morris K. Jacobson, 1976, Alfred A. Knopf
Shells by William K. Emerson, Andreas Feininger, Hardcover, Thames and Hudson,  (0-500-54008-X)
Shells from Cape Cod to Cape May: With Special Reference to the New York City Area by Morris K. Jacobson, William K. Emerson, Softcover, Dover Pubns,  (0-486-25419-4)
Wonders of Barnacles by William K. Emerson, Arnold Ross, Hardcover, Dodd, Mead,  (0-396-06971-1)
Wonders of the World of Shells: Sea, Land, and Fresh-Water by Morris K. Jacobson, William K. Emerson, Hardcover, Dodd, Mead,  (0-396-06326-8)

References

External links
 2,400 years of Malacology info here (search for Emerson in the appropriate section)
 Bio at the American Museum of Natural History

Further reading
 H. S. Gordon, 1960. Conchological Interviews – Part I. William K. Emerson at the American Museum of Natural History. New York Shell Club Notes 64: 4-6
 W. K. Emerson, 1975. The malacological collection of the American Museum of Natural History, New York, New York. New York Shell Club Notes 208: 2
 Anonymous, 1988. Honors to Dr. William K. Emerson. New York Shell Club Notes 306: 2
 Anonymous, 2001. Retirement, Emerson style''. New York Shell Club Notes 360: 4
 Paula M. Mikkelsen1 & Neil H. Landman, In Memoriam: William K. Emerson (1925–2016); The Festivus, vol 49 (1), 2017

1925 births
American malacologists
People associated with the American Museum of Natural History
2016 deaths